Tan Sri Mohd Saleh bin Sulong  is a Malaysian industrialist and chairman of the DRB-HICOM group.

References

External links
Biography

Mohd Saleh bin Sulong
Malaysian Muslims
Malaysian people of Malay descent
Living people
Year of birth missing (living people)